Hermoso Campo is a town in Chaco Province, Argentina. It is the head town of the Dos de Abril Department.

Economy
The local economy is mainly based around the production of soya, maize and cotton.

External links

Populated places in Chaco Province